In National Bellas Hess v. Department of Revenue of Illinois, 386 U.S. 753 (1967), the Supreme Court ruled that a mail order reseller was not required to collect sales tax unless it had some physical contact with the state.

Background
National Bellas Hess was a mail order seller of various consumer products.  Its principal place of business was in Missouri.  It owned no tangible property in Illinois and had no sales outlets, representatives, telephone listing, or solicitors in that state. It did not advertise there by radio, television, billboards, or newspapers. It mailed catalogues to customers throughout the United States, including Illinois. Orders for merchandise were mailed to appellant's Missouri plant, and goods were sent to customers by mail or common carrier. The State of Illinois attempted to force National Bellas Hess to collect a use tax from its customers.

Ruling
The Commerce Clause prohibits a State from imposing the duty of use tax collection and payment upon a seller whose only connection with customers in the State is by common carrier or by mail. The court stated that "the Court has never held that a State may impose the duty of use tax collection and payment upon a seller whose only connection with customers in the State is by common carrier or the United States mail." The opinion cited Miller Brothers Co. v. Maryland, 347 U.S. 340 (1954)

In 1992, the Supreme Court in Quill Corp. v. North Dakota (1992) issued an order overruling part of the case. The court held, "Thus, to the extent that this Court's decisions have indicated that the Clause requires a physical presence in a State, they are overruled."  That case slightly distinguished itself from Bellas Hess by ruling that physical presence was not necessary for a state to impose a duty to collect under the Due Process Clause of the US Constitution, but physical presence was still necessary for a state's use tax on a foreign vendor under the Dormant Commerce Clause of the US Constitution.

The Court stated that in determining whether a state tax falls within the confines of the Due Process Clause, the Court has said that the "simple but controlling question is whether the state has given anything for which it can ask return."

The Court stated, "In this case, the Supreme Court of North Dakota declined to follow Bellas Hess because “the tremendous social, economic, commercial, and legal innovations” of the past quarter-century have rendered its holding “obsole[te].” [cite omitted] we must either reverse the State Supreme Court  or overrule Bellas Hess. While we agree with much of the state court's reasoning, we take the former course. Quill Corp. v. N. Dakota By & Through Heitkamp, 504 U.S. 298, 301-02 (1992).

The entirety of National Bellas Hess was later overruled in South Dakota v. Wayfair, Inc. (2018).

See also 
 Direct Marketing Ass'n v. Brohl (2015)

External links
 

United States Constitution Article One case law
United States Supreme Court cases
United States Supreme Court cases of the Warren Court
Overruled United States Supreme Court decisions
United States Dormant Commerce Clause case law
United States taxation and revenue case law
1967 in United States case law
Sales taxes
Taxation in Illinois
Non-store retailing